The Last Bookstore is an independent bookstore located at 453 S Spring Street, Downtown Los Angeles. Conde Nast Traveler called it California’s largest new and used bookstore.

History

The store was founded in 2005 by Josh Spencer. The first incarnation was a downtown Los Angeles loft. They sold books and other things online only, then focused on books, opened a small bookstore in December 2009 on 4th and Main streets. They moved to the current incarnation in the Spring Arts Tower at 5th and Spring streets on June 3, 2011. The store is 22,000 square feet. The current store is in a former bank with books on two levels, including the former vault.

Vox reported that the store creates visual merchandising through creative displays and book sculptures, which attracts Instagram users, "in the hope of trying to convert Instagram visitors into book purchasers."

In 2021, the bookstore installed a plant wall to the famous book tunnel. There is a restaurant called Yuko Kitchen.

Media
Filmmaker Chad Howitt chronicled The Last Bookstore and its owner, Spencer, in a short documentary titled Welcome to the Last Bookstore, released in 2016. It tells the story of how Spencer was injured as a young man and lost the use of his legs, forcing him to re-examine his life. Los Angeles Film Review called the effort an "ode to resilience."

In popular culture
The bookstore appeared in the 2014 David Fincher movie Gone Girl, and also in the 2018 movie Under the Silver Lake, directed by David Robert Mitchell.

The bookstore featured in the 2021 Netflix series Crime Scene: The Vanishing at the Cecil Hotel.

References

External links

"The Man Behind 'The Last Bookstore'" The Atlantic 

Bookstores in California
Buildings and structures in Los Angeles
Companies based in Los Angeles
Downtown Los Angeles
Independent bookstores of the United States
Retail buildings in California
Retail companies established in 2005
Tourist attractions in Los Angeles